Per Olov Johan Djoos (born May 11, 1968) is a Swedish former ice hockey defenceman who played for the Detroit Red Wings and the New York Rangers of the National Hockey League between 1990 and 1993. He most recently played in the Elitserien for Brynäs IF. He is currently coaching IF Sundsvall in the Swedish Allsvenskan. He is the father of former Detroit Red Wings defenseman Christian Djoos.

Djoos was drafted in the 7th round (127th overall) by Detroit in the 1986 NHL Entry Draft.

Professional career
Djoos grew up playing hockey for his hometown team in Sweden. His solid defensive play earned him local fame and looks from pro scouts. Djoos was drafted in 1986 by the Detroit Red Wings while still playing on his local hockey team. The Red Wings organization felt it best for him to gain more experience in Sweden before coming to America, and so Djoos remained in Sweden.

He was called up to Brynäs IF of the Swedish Elite League in 1988 and remained with the team for two seasons, scoring 18 points each season. The Red Wings wanted to see how his skills would translate into the North American game and so Djoos was brought over to America for the 1990–91 season. He ended up playing for the Adirondack Red Wings of the American Hockey League, but only managed to play 20 games before being called up to the big leagues. Djoos played 26 games for the injury ridden Red Wings, before being traded on March 5, 1991. Djoos was traded, along with Joe Kocur, to the New York Rangers for Kevin Miller, Jim Cummins and Dennis Vial, where he was sent to the Rangers' minor league club, the Binghamton Rangers, for the remainder of the season. Djoos helped lead Binghamton into the playoffs, eventually losing in the semi-finals.

In the 1991–92 season, Djoos played 50 games for the New York Rangers, picking up one goal and 40 penalty minutes. The following season, Djoos found himself back in the minors with Binghamton, where he had his best season to date, scoring 16 goals and 53 assists in 70 games. He also added 10 points in Binghamton's short playoff run. Djoos would also see his last of the NHL in the 1992–93 season, when he was called up to New York for six games, scoring one goal and one assist in that span.

International play
After finishing his career in North America, Djoos headed back across the Atlantic to play for Lugano of the Nationalliga A. Djoos again had a great season and helped Lugano in their short playoff run with 7 assists.

1994–95 would see Djoos back in the SEL playing for Västra Frölunda HC Göteborg. He would spend two short seasons with Frölunda before returning to his old team, Brynäs. Djoos would finish out his career with Brynäs, having his best season with them in 1998–99 when Djoos contributed five goals and 43 assists to lead the team in defensive scoring. Djoos retired after the 2002–03 season after seven seasons with the club.

Career statistics

Regular season and playoffs

International

External links

1968 births
Living people
Adirondack Red Wings players
Binghamton Rangers players
Brynäs IF players
Detroit Red Wings draft picks
Detroit Red Wings players
Frölunda HC players
HC Lugano players
Mora IK players
New York Rangers players
Södertälje SK players
Swedish expatriate sportspeople in Switzerland
Swedish expatriate ice hockey players in the United States
Swedish ice hockey defencemen